Deepa or Dipa is a Hindu name of Sanskrit origin. In India, it is a popular feminine given name, meaning "lamp" and "light".

Notable people named Deepa 
 Deepa Bhaskar, Indian actress
 Deepa Bhatia, Indian film editor
 Deepa Chari, Indian actress and model
 Deepa Dasmunsi (born 1960), Indian politician and member of the 15th Lok Sabha
 Deepa Fernandes, Indian-American journalist and radio host
 Deepa Gahlot, Indian critic and writer
 Deepa Jayakumar (born 1974), Indian politician
 Deepa Kaul (born 1944), Indian politician and social worker
 Deepa Malik (born 1970), Indian athlete
 Deepa Marathe (born 1972), Indian cricketer
 Deepa Mehta (born 1950), Canadian-Indian director and screenwriter
 Deepa Miriam (born 1981), Indian singer
 Deepa M. Ollapally, American political scientist
 Deepa Shree Niraula (born 1975), Nepalese actress
 Deepa Parab (born 1981), Indian actress and entertainer
 Deepa Sahi (born 1965), Indian actress and producer
 Deepa Sannidhi (born 1990), Indian actress
 Deepa Sashindran (born 1974), Indian choreographer and dancer
 Deepa Venkat, Indian actress in Tamil films and television
 Deepa, stage name of Unni Mary in Tamil films

Notable people named Dipa 
 Dipa Nusantara Aidit (1923–1965), Indonesian politician
 Dipa Karmakar (born 1993), Indian gymnast
 Dipa Khondokar, Bangladeshi actress
 Dipa Ma (1911–1989), Indian meditation teacher
 Dipa Shah, Indian actress

See also 
 DEPA, Greek natural gas company
 Depa Billaba, fictional Jedi Master in the Star Wars universe

Hindu given names
Indian feminine given names